Armando Bukele Kattán (December 16, 1944November 30, 2015) was a Salvadoran businessman, intellectual, religious leader and father of the current president of El Salvador, Nayib Bukele.

Early years
Armando Bukele Kattán was born in San Salvador, on December 16, 1944, the son of Humberto Bukele Salman and Victoria Kattán de Bukele. His parents were Christian Palestinians from Bethlehem in Ottoman Palestine and had emigrated to El Salvador at the beginning of the 20th century as part of a emigration wave. He completed his high school studies at the Liceo Salvadoreño.

Studies
In 1967 he graduated as a doctor in Industrial Chemistry from the University of El Salvador.

Entrepreneur
He founded companies dedicated to the textile industry, commerce, pharmaceuticals, advertising and the media.
He also had a philanthropic vision through the work he did at the Kiwanis Club, a community service institution that brings together entrepreneurs and professionals.

Religious leader
Bukele founded four mosques during his lifetime, including the first mosque in El Salvador in 1992. He served as imam of the Salvadoran Islamic Community and was part of the Islamic Organization for Latin America and the Caribbean. He was a founding member of the Council of Religions for Peace of El Salvador.

Published books
 The ABCs of Islam
 Clarifying Concepts in Physics

In 2017, the posthumous book “The precise relativity of the point” was published, an extensive compilation of Bukele's thoughts gathered on his Twitter account and his program “Clarifying Concepts”.

References

1944 births
People from San Salvador
People from San Salvador Department
Salvadoran people of Palestinian descent
University of El Salvador alumni
Chemical engineers
Bukele family
Converts to Islam from Christianity
2015 deaths